Kathy Chow Hoi-mei (born 6 December 1966 in Hong Kong) is a Hong Kong actress and singer who is widely known for her leading roles in Hong Kong TVB series during the late 1980s to 1990s such as The Breaking Point and Time Before Time. Her popularity peaked in Asia following her portrayal of Zhou Zhiruo in the 1994 Taiwanese adaptation of The Heaven Sword and Dragon Saber. She is an ethnic Manchu, being descended from the Gūwalgiya clan of the Bordered White Banner.

Career
She is a former Miss Hong Kong pageant participant. During the late 1980s and 1990s, she actively modeled and starred in Hong Kong TVB series.

She switched work to ATV in 1998. During this time she would occasionally be featured in Hong Kong films and appear in award shows. Kathy was only with ATV up to 2001 and later left to Beijing for new prospects in her career.

After a period of time, in March 2008, Chow returned to TVB and signed on to TVB's action E.U., the sequel to The Academy and On the First Beat.

In recent years, she starred occasionally in a few TVB series, but her focus is still in mainland China's productions.

Filmography

Television series
2020 Count Your Lucky Stars 我好喜欢你 (Youku)
2019 Heavenly Sword and Dragon Slaying Sabre 倚天屠龙记 (Tencent)
2018 Ashes of Love 香蜜沉沉烬如霜 (JSTV)
2017 As Flowers Fade And Fly Across The Sky 花谢花飞花满天 (ZJTV)
2017 Xuan-Yuan Sword Legend: The Clouds of Han 轩辕剑之汉之云 (Dragon TV)
2015 The Cage of Love 抓住彩虹的男人 (ZJTV)
2014 The Empress of China 武媚娘传奇 (Hunan TV)
2013 Sniper Standoff 神枪狙击 (TVB)
2012 Wang Yang Ming 王阳明 (韩国CHING TV)
2009 In The Chamber Of Bliss 蔡鍔與小鳳仙 (TVB)
2009 E.U. (Emergency Unit) 學警狙擊 (TVB)
2008 The Legend of the Condor Heroes 射雕英雄传 (KMTV-1)
2007 Ao Jian Jiang Hu 傲剑江湖 (CTV)
2003 Asian Heroes 亚洲英雄 亞洲英雄 (ATV)
2001 To Where He Belongs 縱橫天下 / 纵横天下 (ATV)
2000 Showbiz Tycoon 影城大亨 (ATV)
1999 Flaming Brothers 縱橫四海 (ATV)
1998 Secret of the Heart 天地豪情 (TVB)
1997 Time Before Time 大鬧廣昌隆 (TVB)
1996 今生今世 (TVS－4"黄金剧场")
1995 Plain Love 情濃大地 (TVB)
1994 The Heaven Sword and Dragon Saber 倚天屠龍記 (TTV)
1991 The Breaking Point 今生無悔 (TVB)
1991 The Sword Of Conquest 怒劍嘯狂沙 (TVB)
1990 Cherished Moments 回到未嫁時 (TVB)
1990 Rain in the Heart 成功路上 (TVB)
1990 Where I Belong 笑傲在明天 (TVB)
1989 Looking Back in Anger 義不容情 (TVB)
1989 The Legend of Master Chan 吉星報喜 (TVB)
1988 The Saga of the Lost Kingdom 贏單傳奇 (TVB)
1987 The Price of Growing Up 生命之旅 (TVB)
1987 Fate Takes A Hand 杜心五 (TVB)
1986 The Superlative Affections 赤腳紳士 (TVB)
1986 The Upheaval 小岛风云 (TVB)
1986 Heir to the Throne Is... 真命天子 (TVB)
1986 The Feud of Two Brothers 流氓大亨 (TVB)
1985 The Yang's Saga 楊家將 (TVB)

Films 
2020 Returning from Armor (卸甲归来)
2019 Bone China (骨瓷)
2019 The Rookies (素人特工)
2019 The Magic School (捉妖学院)
2019 The Incredible Monk 3 (济公之降龙有悔)
2017 Mr.Pride VS Miss Prejudice (傲娇与偏见)
2015 Hot Blood Band (熱血男人幫)
2013 The Legend of Dunhuang (敦煌傳奇)
2011 Legendary Amazons (楊門女將之軍令如山)
2011 To Love or Not (一夜未了情)
2007 Crazy Money & Funny Men (大話股神)
2004 A Decisive Move (同步凶間)
2004 City Crisis (中年危機)
2003 We're Not the Worst (五個墮落的男女)
2002 Memento (35米厘兇心人)
2001 Vampire Controller (趕屍先生)
2000 A Game of No Rule (無法無天)
2000 Sound from the Dark (陰風耳)
1998 Nude Fear (追兇20年)
1998 The Sleepless Town (不夜城)
1998 Beast Cops (野獸刑警)
1998 Cheap Killers (愈墮落愈英雄)
1998 The Love and Sex of the Eastern Hollywood (愛在娛樂圈的日子)
1997 Cause We Are So Young (求戀期)
1996 First Option (飛虎)
1995 Don't Give a Damn (冇面俾)
1994 Love Recipe (愛情色香味)
1994 The Private Eye Blues (非常偵探)
1993 Fight Back to School III (逃學威龍III之龍過雞年)
1993 Insanity (觸目驚心)
1992 James Wong in Japan & Korea (帶你嫖韓日)
1991 The Holy Virgin Versus the Evil Dead (魔唇劫)
1990 King of Gambler (賭王)
1990 The Wildgoose Chase (不文小丈夫)
1989 My Dear Son (我要富貴)
1989 Nobody's Hero (情義我心知)
1988 The Truth (法內情)
1988 How to Pick Girls Up! (求愛敢死隊)
1986 Cadets on the Beat (豬仔出更)

Studio albums
1995 Sunrise Love (日出愛情)
1997 Loving You (迷戀你)

Other appearances
Kathy Chow Hoi-Mei also appeared in Jacky Cheung's music video for the song 吻別 in 1993.

References

External links
 
 
 
 
 hkcinemagic entry
 lovehkfilm entry

1966 births
Living people
20th-century Hong Kong actresses
21st-century Hong Kong actresses
Hong Kong people of Manchu descent
TVB veteran actors
Manchu actresses
Manchu singers